Sarah Blackwood (born 6 May 1971) is an English recording artist. She came to prominence as the lead singer of Dubstar, and as Client B in the band Client.

Career
Blackwood was born in Halifax, West Yorkshire, England, attended a local school, and went to Newcastle University to study interior design.  She lived in Manchester when operating exclusively within Dubstar, but lives and works in London as of 2015.

Dubstar

Formerly known as The Joans, Dubstar were initially a two-piece band, with Chris Wilkie on guitar and Steve Hillier on vocals and keyboards. Sarah Blackwood was invited to join the band in August 1993 and replaced Hillier on vocals in early 1994; Dubstar were signed shortly after.

The band released four albums with Blackwood on vocals: Disgraceful (1995), Goodbye (1997), Make It Better (2000) and One (2018). A compilation, Stars: The Best of Dubstar was released in 2004. Blackwood moved on to other projects but kept in touch with Dubstar members as her debut solo EP in 2008 called Acoustic at the Club Bar & Dining features Wilkie on guitar.

Client

Blackwood joined the band Technique to replace Xan Tyler as singer for a European tour with Depeche Mode in 2002. Shortly afterwards, Kate Holmes, the other member of the band, and Blackwood decided to write together and formed the new group Client. She used the stage name Client B since the band preferred not to highlight the names of its members, rather identifying each as "Client" plus a letter from the alphabet.

Discography

Albums
Dubstar
1995: Disgraceful 
1997: Goodbye
2000: Make It Better
2004: Stars – The Best of Dubstar (compilation album)
2018: One
2022: Two

Client 
(Sarah Blackwood credited as Client B) 
2003: Client
2004: City
2007: Heartland
2009: Command

EPs
in Dubstar
2000: Self Same Thing EP 
as Client B
2007: Client B Acoustic at the Club Bar & Dining

Singles
(For details of singles, refer to tables in the discography sections in article of Dubstar and of Client)

References

1971 births
Living people
Alternative dance musicians
English songwriters
People from Halifax, West Yorkshire
Singers from London
Musicians from Manchester
Musicians from Yorkshire
English women in electronic music
21st-century English women singers
21st-century English singers